The palefin sawbelly (Hoplostethus latus) is a medium-sized deep-sea fish species belonging to the slimehead family. It can reach sizes of up to  TL.

References

External links
 Palefin Sawbelly, Hoplostethus latus McCulloch 1914 @ fishesofaustralia.net.au

Hoplostethus
Marine fish of Southern Australia
Marine fish of Western Australia
Fish described in 1914